Magnolia zenii is a species of plant in the family Magnoliaceae. It is endemic to China.

Listed as "critically endangered," there were only a few dozen found left of these when the variety was first discovered in China in 1931 according to MEG McCONAHEY writing in THE PRESS DEMOCRAT.

Taxonomy
Magnolia zenii was described by botanist Wan-Chun Cheng in 1933.

Gallery

References

External links

 Magnolia zenii images at the Arnold Arboretum of Harvard University Plant Image Database

zenii
Endemic flora of China
Critically endangered plants
Garden plants of Asia
Ornamental trees
Taxonomy articles created by Polbot